Borislav Topić (born 22 May 1984) is a Bosnian former football defender.

Club career
Born in Prijedor he begin playing in his home-town club FK Rudar Prijedor where he played until 2006, when he moved to Serbia by signing with FK BSK Borča.  After 4 seasons with BSK Borča, the first 3 playing in the Serbian First League and the last one at highest level, Serbian SuperLiga, he moved to Romania by signing with Liga I side FCM Târgu Mureș.

International career
He was part of the Bosnia and Herzegovina U-19 team.

0Pplklpkko

References

External links

1984 births
Living people
People from Prijedor
Serbs of Bosnia and Herzegovina
Association football defenders
Bosnia and Herzegovina footballers
FK Rudar Prijedor players
FK BSK Borča players
ASA 2013 Târgu Mureș players
FK Novi Pazar players
NK Jedinstvo Bihać players
Nõmme Kalju FC players
SSU Politehnica Timișoara players
Serbian SuperLiga players
Liga I players
Premier League of Bosnia and Herzegovina players
Meistriliiga players
Esiliiga players
Liga II players
Bosnia and Herzegovina expatriate footballers
Expatriate footballers in Serbia
Bosnia and Herzegovina expatriate sportspeople in Serbia
Expatriate footballers in Romania
Bosnia and Herzegovina expatriate sportspeople in Romania
Expatriate footballers in Estonia
Bosnia and Herzegovina expatriate sportspeople in Estonia